William Porter Payne (born October 13, 1947) is the former chairman of Augusta National Golf Club, having served in that position from 2006 to 2017 and overseeing the introduction of the first women to the club's membership rolls.

He was Managing Director of Gleacher & Company, Vice Chairman of Bank of America, Vice Chairman of Premiere Global Services, Inc., Vice Chairman of WebMD, and a member of the Board of Directors of Lincoln National Corporation and Cousins Properties.  He is chairman of Centennial Holding Company, an Atlanta-based real estate investment concern.

Through the late 1980s and early 1990s, Payne was a leading advocate for bringing the Olympic Games to Atlanta and, in 1996, he was named president and chief executive officer of the Atlanta Committee for the Olympic Games (ACOG).

Early life and education
Born in Athens, Georgia, Payne played football for the hometown University of Georgia; in his sophomore season in 1966, the fourth-ranked Bulldogs lost one game by one point, and he caught a touchdown pass in their Cotton Bowl win.

Payne received his Bachelor of Arts (A.B.)  with honors in political science in 1969 from the university as well as his law degree (J.D.) from its School of Law in 1973. While at the university, he was initiated into the Gridiron Secret Society and the Georgia Alpha chapter of Phi Delta Theta fraternity. He received an honorary degree Doctor of Laws from Oglethorpe University in 1991.

1996 Olympics
Payne first had the idea of Atlanta hosting the Olympic Games in 1987 and began to bring others to support this vision.  He first gained support of Atlanta leaders for this effort, including then-mayor Andrew Young, an ally who helped Payne convince International Olympic Committee members to award Atlanta the games.  Payne's plan for the games depended heavily on private support, leading him to convince sponsors to back the games.  In September 1990, Atlanta was selected by the IOC to host the 1996 Games, surprising many.

After winning the bid, Payne remained as the head of the Atlanta Committee for the Olympic Games, serving as the chief administrator to organize the Olympics.  He was the first person to lead the bid effort and then remain to lead the Games.

Tenure as Augusta National chairman
On May 5, 2006, Billy Payne was announced as the replacement for Hootie Johnson as chairman of Augusta National Golf Club, home of the Masters Tournament, with Payne taking office with the opening of the club's season that October. As chairman, Payne made some adjustments at the Masters, including a new television contract with ESPN that allowed for unprecedented coverage of the par-3 tournament, beginning in 2008. Also that same year, a junior-patrons program was instituted, which allows one Augusta National Golf Club-accredited patron the opportunity to personally bring one junior patron (ages: 8-16), free of charge, to each of the four competitive rounds of the Masters. The program is not available on practice round days, and is also unavailable to company patrons.

On April 7, 2010, immediately before that year's Masters Tournament, Payne criticized Tiger Woods, stating that he failed as a role model. During the HBO Max documentary series "Tiger", Los Angeles Times writer Thomas Bonk said the elite golf tournament  always has "a thin undercurrent of racism" and called Payne's comments "a public whipping", a characterization backed up by Bryant Gumbel.

In 2011, Payne and his fellow members at Augusta National continued further with diverting from the club's usually uncompromising, tradition-laden ways by establishing another contemporary modification to their featured golf tournament. They sanctioned a video game that features the Masters name, logo, and their fabled golf course.  The video game is so technologically sophisticated that if rain – for example – should happen to be falling in Augusta, Ga. on the day an end-user powers up the game from anywhere around the world, rain will also be simulated on the end-user's video screen.

Payne said in a statement: "'Tiger Woods PGA Tour 12: The Masters' will inspire the next generation of golfers." According to Payne's release, the proceeds from sales of the video game made by Augusta National will benefit a non-profit foundation that promotes youth golf.

At the 2012 Masters Tournament, the public was reminded that some traditions at Augusta National Golf Club (ANGC) still hold true to form as Payne sideswiped reporters' questions about any prospect of allowing a woman (specifically IBM CEO Virginia Rometty) to join ANGC.  Payne explained the issue of who gets invited to join ANGC, which is notoriously known as having male-only members, is "subject to the private deliberations of the members."  ANGC offered prior membership to the last four IBM CEOs as IBM is one of three major corporate sponsors of the Masters.  However, on August 20, 2012, Payne announced that former secretary of state Condoleezza Rice and business executive Darla Moore would be the first female members of the club after 75 years of all male membership.

On August 23, 2017, Augusta National announced that Payne would retire as chairman of the club effective October 16, to be succeeded by Fred Ridley.

Honors
Payne received the Olympic Order in Gold at the Closing Ceremonies of the Atlanta Olympic Games in 1996. In 2014, he was inducted as a Georgia Trustee. The honor is given by the Georgia Historical Society, in conjunction with the Governor of Georgia, to individuals whose accomplishments and community service reflect the ideals of the founding body of Trustees, which governed the Georgia colony from 1732 to 1752. He was elected to the World Golf Hall of Fame, class of 2019, in the lifetime achievement category.

References 

 Atlanta Brave, Donald Katz, Sports Illustrated, January 8, 1996
 NCAA Theodore Roosevelt Award Bio
 Lecture Of Tiger Not For Us, Ray Ratto, San Francisco Chronicle, April 9, 2010
 Racism Still Affects World's No. 1 Golfer, Scott Michaux, The Augusta Chronicle, April 2, 2006

1947 births
Living people
Georgia Bulldogs football players
Sportspeople from Athens, Georgia
Players of American football from Georgia (U.S. state)
Presidents of the Organising Committees for the Olympic Games
University of Georgia School of Law alumni
Golf administrators
World Golf Hall of Fame inductees
Recipients of the Olympic Order